Edrissa is a masculine given name. Notable people with the name include:

Edrisa Lubega (born 1998), Ugandan footballer
Edrissa Marong (died 2023), Gambian long-distance runner
Edrissa Sanneh (born 1951), Gambian-born Italian journalist
Edrissa Sonko (born 1980), Gambian footballer

See also
Idrissa
Driss
Idris (name)
Idriss

African masculine given names